Alk is a small village in the former municipality of Shënkoll in the Lezhë County in Albania. At the 2015 local government reform it became part of the municipality Lezhë. It has a population of about 100 inhabitants.

Geography
It is located close to the Mat River. It is 3.5 km from the Adriatic, 16 km from Lezhë and 55.3 km from Tirana. Nearby localities include Tale, Shënkoll, Grykë Lumi, Rrilë, Barbullojë, and Gajush.

Economy
The economy is predominantly agricultural and breeding of sheep, cattle and pigs.

References

Populated places in Lezhë
Villages in Lezhë County